Tâmega may refer to:
 Tâmega River, in Spain and Portugal
 Tâmega Subregion, Portugal
 Guilherme Tâmega, six time world bodyboarding champion
 Tamega, a Portuguese Navy destroyer